William Miller (died May 1894) was a Scottish footballer who played as a right winger.

Career
Miller played club football for Third Lanark, and made one appearance for Scotland in 1876. He was one of the "founding fathers" of Third Lanark and was runner-up with them in the Scottish Cup finals of 1876 and 1878.

References

Year of birth missing
1894 deaths
Scottish footballers
Scotland international footballers
Third Lanark A.C. players
Association football wingers
Place of birth missing
Date of death missing
Place of death missing